State Route 64 (SR 64) is an east–west state highway in Middle Tennessee. The  route goes from the Lewisburg area to rural western Cannon County via Shelbyville and Beech Grove.

Route description

Marshall County

SR 64 begins in the Marshall County community of Farmington, at an intersection with US 31A, SR 11, and SR 271.

Bedford County

It then goes east and crosses into Bedford County, going through Bedford and farmland before intersecting and becoming concurrent with SR 130 and entering Shelbyville. In Shelbyville they intersect and become concurrent with US 231/SR 10/SR 82 and turn north. They then enter downtown and have an intersection with SR 387 (Lane Parkway), where US 231/SR 10 split and turn north, while SR 64/SR 130 turn east on SR 82. They then go around the east side of downtown before splitting, with SR 82 going south, SR 130 going southeast, and SR 64 going east. SR 64 then goes through some suburbs before coming to an intersection with US 41A/SR 16. A short distance later, it intersects SR 437 (Shelbyville Bypass). SR 64 then leaves Shelbyville and continues east. It then curves north to enter Wartrace, where it intersects with SR 269. It then curves east again and intersects SR 82 again before crossing into Coffee County and entering Beech Grove.

Coffee County

In Beech Grove, SR 64 has an interchange with I-24 at Exit 97. It then has an intersection with US 41/SR 2 before leaving Beech Grove. SR 64 then enters some mountains and becomes curvy before entering Cannon County.

Cannon County

It then enters Bradyville and has a junction with SR 99 and turning north. SR 64 then enters Readyville to end at US 70S/SR 1.

Major intersections

References

064
064
064
064
064